David Solomon (born 1976 in Kingston, New York) was an American artist and painter.

Solomon studied at the San Francisco Art Institute. Solomon is an artist based in Santa Fe's art community; his work has been shown in many exhibitions and art fairs across the country, including David Richard Contemporary, Gerald Peters Gallery in Santa Fe, Peter Marcelle Gallery in Bridgehampton NY, Dean Jenson Gallery in Milwaukee, Brown Art Space in San Francisco, Aqua Art Fair in Miami, and Cindy Lisica Gallery in Houston.

"David Solomon has been an active member of the Santa Fe art community for the 11 years he has lived here, as both a painter and an independent curator," writes Jan Ernst Adlmann in Art in America magazine. "His latest exhibition demonstrated not only his artistic maturity but also his consistent drive toward pictorial originality."

"Solomon continues to map inner territories of the imagination through an idiosyncratic synthesis of figurative inferences and abstract expression," writes Jon Carver, Art Ltd Magazine

"The artist's forte is the depiction of space without defining it," writes Kathryn M Davis in The Magazine. "He likes to suggest dimensionality without showing it, thus enticing the viewer to engage. Once the vocabulary of lyrical abstraction and symbolism emerges, the playfulness of the forms becomes clearer, while their significance deepens."

Life 
Deceased December 2017.

Examples of his work

References

External links 

1976 births
Living people
Artists from Santa Fe, New Mexico
People from Kingston, New York